Hancea integrifolia is a plant species in the family Euphorbiaceae. It is native to Mauritius.

It is a tree with unisexual flowers and occur at an altitude of 1000 m asl.

References

Acalypheae
Endemic flora of Mauritius